Santa Cristina de Valmadrigal is a municipality located in the province of León, Castile and León, Spain.

References

Municipalities in the Province of León